"Losing My Edge" is the debut single by American rock band LCD Soundsystem. It was released as a 12-inch single in July 2002, through DFA Records. It was later featured on the CD version of their eponymous debut studio album. "Losing My Edge" peaked at number 115 on the UK Singles Chart. It was also listed at number 13 on Pitchforks Top 500 Songs of the 2000s list. In October 2011, NME placed it at number 40 on its "150 Best Tracks of the Past 15 Years" list. In June 2018, Rolling Stone listed it at number 77 on its "The 100 Greatest Songs of the Century – So Far" list.

Background
In an interview with the music site "ireallylovemusic", James Murphy (the leader of the group) explained his inspiration for the song: "When I was DJing, playing Can, Liquid Liquid, ESG, all that kind of stuff, I became kind of cool for a moment, which was a total anomaly. And when I heard other DJs playing similar music ...I was afraid that this new found coolness was going to go away and that's where 'Losing My Edge' comes from."

Composition
"Losing My Edge" is a dance-punk and alternative dance song. It features a rhythm similar to "Change" by Killing Joke.

Track listing
 dfa 2123

Personnel
Personnel adapted from the liner notes of the single's Record Store Day 2012 release.
Alex Epton – synthesizer
James Murphy – vocals, bass, composing, drums, programming, synthesizer
Bob Weston – mastering
Nancy Whang – vocals

Charts

Release history

References
Notes

Citations

External links

2002 debut singles
2002 songs
LCD Soundsystem songs
List songs